The Battle of Doiran was a 1917 battle between the United Kingdom and Bulgaria during World War I.

Planning
During the Second Conference of the Military Counsel of the Entente in Chantilly, it was decided to continue with the attempts at a breakthrough. The task for the Entente forces on the Macedonian front was to inflict major defeats on the Bulgarian army and effect a wide breakthrough in the Balkans in a relatively short time. The Allied command, which expected reinforcements, planned a major assault in the direction of Vardar and Doiran. In 1917 the 2nd (Bulgarian) Thracian Infantry Division was replaced at Doiran by the 9th Pleven Infantry division under the command of Colonel Vladimir Vazov.

Initial attacks 
On 9 and 10 February the Allies attacked the 33rd Svishtov and 34th Troyan Regiments but were repulsed by a decisive counter-attack by the Troyan Regiment. The British advance on 21 February was repulsed by Bulgarian artillery after a two-day battle.

The Allied command found that the Bulgarian positions were better fortified than in the previous year, so it ordered a systematic artillery barrage on these defences. In the meantime, it continued the development of their forming-up ground which was 800–1,500 m from the defensive lines of the Pleven Division. To make the breakthrough, the British concentrated three divisions (the 22nd, 26th, 60th), with its artillery – more than 43,000 men, 160 guns, 110 mortars and 440 machine-guns. The objective did not differ much from the battle in the previous year, the main blow was on a front of 5–6 km towards Kalatepe.

The prognosis of the Bulgarian command for a major Allied offensive was confirmed by intelligence. The 9th Pleven Division was reinforced and had a total of 30,000 men, 147 guns, 35 mortars, 130 machine-guns.

According to the orders of the High Command the front was divided into three zones with different widths: the right from the River Vardar to the Varovita heights with a width of 13 km, was defended by 1st Brigade (6 battalions with 48 guns, 12 mortars and 56 machine guns); the central from the Varovita heights to the Karakondzho heights, 4 km wide, defended by the 57th Regiment (3 battalions) and the left from the Karakondzho heights to Lake Doiran, 9 km wide, defended by 2nd Brigade (6 battalions, 76 guns, 19 mortars and 52 machine-guns).

Defensive positions 

In 1917 the Bulgarian defensive positions and fortifications were further improved. It included two main positions with two rows of continuous trenches 1.5 – 2 metres deep, 200 to 1000 m apart and linked with passages for communication. In front of these positions was a two line system of wire entanglements. Between the rows of trenches watch points, shelters, machine-gun nests and sunken batteries were constructed. Behind these defences were concrete galleries, fire positions for the artillery, and platforms for ammunition. In front of the main position there were smaller fortifications, with a partly constructed secondary position 2 – 5 km to its rear.

The battle 
The battle for a breakthrough in the Bulgarian positions began on 22 April and continued  intermittently until 9 May 1917. The assault began with a bitter four-day artillery barrage in which the British fired about 100,000 shells. As a result, the earthworks and some wooden structures in the front positions were destroyed. The Bulgarians also opened fire from the batteries between Vardar and Doiran. Vladimir Vazov ordered fire day and night on the Allied positions. The initial several-hour struggle between the British and Bulgarian batteries was followed by a one-hour Bulgarian counter-barrage in which 10,000 shells were fired. 

The British infantry began its attack on the night of 24–25 April. 12 companies attacked the Bulgarian 2nd Brigade and after a bloody fight managed to take the "Nerezov", "Knyaz Boris" and "Pazardzhik" positions. After a Bulgarian counter-attack, the British were repulsed with heavy casualties and by 8 pm had retreated. The British assaults on the right and central fronts were also repulsed with heavy casualties after help from the Bulgarian artillery.

The British attacks in the next two days were defeated by constant Bulgarian fire and counter-attacks. Due to this fire, the British withdrew to their initial positions on 27 April. The Bulgarians immediately started to reconstruct the destroyed fortifications.

Due to criticism by their high command, the British made new attempts at a breakthrough. On 8 May, after a long artillery barrage, they began another attack. The main assault started at 9 pm with five waves of British troops attacking the Bulgarian positions. After four attacks during the night of 8–9 May the British were defeated and suffered enormous casualties. A Times correspondent wrote that the British soldiers called the "Boris" point "the valley of death".

The artillery duel continued until 9 May but due to heavy casualties the British had to abandon all attacks. They lost 12,000 killed, wounded and captured of which more than 2,250 were buried by the Bulgarian defenders. The losses of the Ninth Pleven Infantry Division were 2,000 of whom 900 died from disease and wounds.

Vladimir Vazov was promoted to Major-General.

Aftermath 
In the next 16 months, the front was relatively quiet apart from local skirmishes. Both sides used that time to further strengthen and consolidate their positions. In 1918 a massive Anglo-Greek attack was repulsed by the Pleven Division in the Third Battle of Doiran.

Notes and references

External links 
The Times history of the war (part 20) pages 3-6
Macedonia 1917 (The 11th Battalion Worcestershire)
Doiran Epopee (in Bulgarian, archived link). Alternative location

Battles of the Balkans Theatre (World War I)
Battles of World War I involving Bulgaria
Battles of World War I involving the United Kingdom
Military history of North Macedonia
Vardar Macedonia (1912–1918)
1917 in Bulgaria
Macedonian front
April 1917 events
May 1917 events